Futebol Clube da Maia is a Portuguese football club based in Maia, Greater Metropolitan Area of Porto. Founded on 4 April 1954, it currently plays in the Porto Regional League, holding home matches at the Estádio Professor Doutor Vieira de Carvalho, which holds 15,000 spectators.

History
Maia never competed in the top division, but had a nine-year spell in the second level from 1997 to 2006. In its first season in the category, it faced Porto in the Taça de Portugal, losing 4–5 at home in the round of 16 after eliminating Moreirense and Feirense in the previous rounds.

At the end of the 2006–07 season, Maia was relegated for the second consecutive time, thus falling into the fourth division. It folded in 2008 due to serious financial problems, starting competing again the following year, in the second regional division in Porto, and immediately achieved promotion.

Season to season

Achievements
Segunda Divisão Série Norte: 1996–97

References

External links
Official website 
Zerozero team profile

 
Football clubs in Portugal
Association football clubs established in 1954
1954 establishments in Portugal
Liga Portugal 2 clubs